Qeshlaq-e Piazi (also Romanized as Qeshlāq-e Pīāzī; also known as Qeshlāq) is a village in Dastjerd Rural District, Gugan District, Azarshahr County, East Azerbaijan Province, Iran. At the 2006 census, its population was 732, in 179 families.

References 

Populated places in Azarshahr County